Joseph-Grégoire Bélanger (April 8, 1889 – March 17, 1957) was a politician Quebec, Canada and a Member of the Legislative Assembly of Quebec (MLA).

Early life

He was born on April 8, 1889, in Saint-Roch-des-Aulnaies and became an optician.

Member of the legislature

He ran as an Action libérale nationale candidate in the district of Montréal-Dorion in the 1935 provincial election and won. Choquette joined Maurice Duplessis's Union Nationale and was re-elected in 1936. He did not run for re-election in 1939.

Death

He died on March 17, 1957.

References

1890s births
1957 deaths
Action libérale nationale MNAs
Union Nationale (Quebec) MNAs